Adam Setliff (born December 15, 1969) is a retired discus thrower from the United States, who represented his native country at two consecutive Summer Olympics (1996 and 2000), finishing 12th and 5th respectively. He set his personal best (69.44 m) in the men's discus throw on July 21, 2001, at a meet in La Jolla, California. Adam picked up a discus for the first time as a young boy and began throwing it outside in his childhood yard in Big Horn, WY, this is where his love of throwing began.  He retired prior to the 2004 season. Currently, Adam lives in Dallas, Texas and practices real estate law while running Hudson Title Group.

Achievements

External links
 Adam Setliff at USATF
 
 
 

1969 births
Living people
People from El Dorado, Arkansas
American male discus throwers
American male shot putters
Athletes (track and field) at the 1996 Summer Olympics
Athletes (track and field) at the 2000 Summer Olympics
Olympic track and field athletes of the United States